Rise is the fifth studio album by hardcore punk pioneers Bad Brains. It is the first Bad Brains album to be released on a major label (Epic Records) and is notable for the absence of two original members: here, Israel Joseph I replaces vocalist H.R. and Cro-Mags drummer Mackie Jayson, who was a session musician on the band's previous album Quickness, replaces drummer Earl Hudson.

The album was released in the wake of a number of funk rock acts whose sounds recalled the latter work of Bad Brains.

Track listing
"Rise" (Joseph I, Jenifer)
"Miss Freedom" (Joseph I, Jenifer)
"Unidentified" (Jenifer, Miller, Jayson)
"Love Is the Answer" (Joseph I, Jenifer, Miller)
"Free" (Joseph I, Jenifer, Jayson)
"Hair" (L. Graham)
"Coming in Numbers" (Jenifer, Miller)
"Yes Jah" (Joseph I, Miller)
"Take Your Time" (Joseph I, Jenifer, Miller, Jayson)
"Peace of Mind" (Joseph I, Jenifer, Miller, Jayson)
"Without You" (Joseph I, Jenifer)
"Outro" (Jenifer, Miller)

Personnel
Israel Joseph I – vocals
Dr. Know – guitar
Darryl Jenifer – bass
Mackie Jayson – drums

References

Bad Brains albums
1993 albums
Albums produced by Beau Hill
Epic Records albums